The Magic Mountain is a 2015 Romanian animated drama film directed by Anca Damian. It tells the story of Adam Jacek Winkler, a Polish anti-communist who in the 1980s fought against the Soviet Union in the Soviet–Afghan War, alongside Ahmad Shah Massoud. The film was co-produced with French and Polish companies. It was made using a mix of animation techniques and Winkler's personal photographs, sketches and film footage. The English-language version of the film stars Jean-Marc Barr as the voice of Winkler.

The film received a Special Jury Mention at the 2015 Karlovy Vary International Film Festival. Damian envisions the film as the second part in a trilogy about heroism, after Crulic: The Path to Beyond from 2011.

In 2015 he obtained the prize ANIMAFICX section of the 53rd International Festival of Gijon.

In 2016 the film won Grand Prix - Best Feature Film award at the 26th edition of Animafest Zagreb - World Festival of Animated Film Zagreb.

Cast
 Jean-Marc Barr as Adam Jacek Winkler (English version)
 Christophe Miossec as Adam Jacek Winkler (French version)
 Lizzie Brocheré as Anna Winkler

Reception
Boyd van Hoeij of The Hollywood Reporter found the early parts of the film, before Winkler reaches Afghanistan, to be messy and too light on facts. He also found the mixed technique problematic: "While this approach shows off the versatility of Damian in different media and visually suggests something of the protagonist's agitation and anarchic streak, this choice works against the film because the narrative itself is also restless and somewhat haphazard, at least for the film's first half." Hoeij wrote that Winkler's "emotional journey or journeys are never quite made tangible".

References

External links 
 

2015 biographical drama films
2015 war drama films
2015 animated films
2015 films
Films set in Afghanistan
Biographical films about military personnel
Romanian animated films
Romanian biographical drama films
Soviet–Afghan War films
2015 drama films